Fimbristylis macrantha is a sedge of the family Cyperaceae that is native to Australia.

It blooms between January and March and produces brown flowers.

In Western Australia it is found on rocky hills and scree slopes in the Kimberley region where it grows in gravelly lateritic soils.

References

Plants described in 1874
Flora of Western Australia
macrantha
Endemic flora of Australia
Taxa named by Johann Otto Boeckeler